Lake Andes National Wildlife Refuge is located in the U.S. state of South Dakota and includes 5,638 acres (22.81 km2). The refuge is managed by the U.S. Fish and Wildlife Service and is part of the Lake Andes National Wildlife Refuge Complex. Only 938 acres (3.79 km2) is under U.S. Government ownership with the rest being an easement to ensure greater habitat protection.

Lake Andes is a natural lake that is fed by underground springs and about every 20 years, the lake dries up. Two dikes separate the lake into three sections, allowing better water retention during the dry summers. Over one hundred species of birds nest here including Bald eagles, Ring-necked pheasant, Northern pintail and numerous species of ducks and geese.

Various mammal species inhabit the refuge, including White-tailed deer, coyote, and badger, muskrat which are all relatively common.

References

External links
 

National Wildlife Refuges in South Dakota
Protected areas of Charles Mix County, South Dakota
Protected areas established in 1936
Andes
Andes
1936 establishments in South Dakota
Nature centers in South Dakota